Rose of the Rancho is a 1914 American silent Western film directed by Cecil B. DeMille. It is based upon the play of the same name by David Belasco and Richard Walton Tully. The film cost $16,988 to make, and grossed $87,028. A 35mm print of this film exists in the George Eastman House film archive. The film was remade in 1936 by Paramount and starred John Boles and Gladys Swarthout.

Plot
Esra Kincaid (La Reno) takes land by force and, having taken the Espinoza land, his sights are set on the Castro rancho. US government agent Kearney (Johnston) holds him off till the cavalry shows up and he can declare his love for Juanita "The Rose of the Rancho" (Barriscale).

Cast
 Bessie Barriscale as Juanita
 Dick La Reno as Esra Kincaid
 Jack W. Johnston as Kearney, Government Agent (as J.W. Johnston)
 Monroe Salisbury as Don Luis Del Torre
 James Neill as Padre Antonio
 Sydney Deane as Espinoza
 William Elmer as Half Breed
 Jane Darwell as Senora Castro Kenton, Juanita's
 Al Ernest Garcia
 Jeanie Macpherson (as Jeanie McPherson)
 Mrs. Lewis McCord
 Francisca de la Vinna as Priest at wedding ceremony
 William C. deMille (uncredited)
 Lucien Littlefield (uncredited)

References

External links
 
 
 Novelization of Rose of the Rancho in the January 1915 issue of Photoplay Magazine

1914 films
1914 Western (genre) films
American black-and-white films
American films based on plays
Films directed by Cecil B. DeMille
Paramount Pictures films
Silent American Western (genre) films
1910s American films
1910s English-language films